Fez I: Wizard's Vale is an adventure for fantasy role-playing games published by Mayfair Games in 1987.

Contents
Fez I: Wizard's Vale is a three-round tournament scenario. The player characters must retrieve several of Fez the Wizard's magic items, and wake him from a magical sleep, then help him to slay the dragon Scarsnout.  It is the revised version of Fez I: Valley of Trees.

Publication history
Fez I: Wizard's Vale was written by Len Bland and James Robert, with a cover by David Cherry, and was published by Mayfair Games in 1987 as a 48-page book.

Reception

References

Fantasy role-playing game adventures
Role Aids
Role-playing game supplements introduced in 1987